Bayou Segnette State Park is located in Westwego, Jefferson Parish, southwest of New Orleans, Louisiana, on the west bank of the Mississippi River.

Bayou Segnette is not far from the urban center of New Orleans, yet it features access to two types of wetlands, swamp and marsh. Saltwater intrusion coming into the canals from the Gulf of Mexico created the marsh. This is a remarkable habitat for plant and wildlife. This habitat is home to American alligators, coypu, nine-banded armadillos, Virginia opossum, raccoons, American mink, red-tailed hawks, kites, red-winged blackbirds, bald eagles, and northern cardinals.

Features

Alario Center
Bayou Segnette Field
 Boat launch with access to the marshlands and waterways of the Bayou 
 16 vacation cabins with air conditioning, heating, and fishing piers
 Camping for RVs and tents – There are 98 sites with water and electricity.
 Comfort stations with showers and laundry
 RV dump station
 Group camp with kitchen and dormitories for up to 120 people
 Meeting room which accommodates 60 to 100 people
 Wave pool in the day use area and swimming pool in the campground area
  nature trail

See also
Grand Isle State Park
List of Louisiana state parks

References
 Pamphlets distributed by the Louisiana State Parks.

External links
Bayou Segnette State Park – official state web page

Protected areas of Jefferson Parish, Louisiana
State parks of Louisiana
Wetlands and bayous of Louisiana
Bodies of water of Jefferson Parish, Louisiana